Banwoldang Station is a station of the Daegu Metro Line 1 and Line 2 in Deoksan-dong, Jung District, Daegu, South Korea. Banwoldang Station is the only transfer station of Daegu Metro. Banwoldang underground shopping was created with the second line opening.

Banwoldang, the name of station, is derived from the location of the first department store in Daegu.

External links 
  Cyber station information of Line 1 from Daegu Metropolitan Transit Corporation
  Cyber station information of Line 2 from Daegu Metropolitan Transit Corporation

Railway stations opened in 1997
Jung District, Daegu
Daegu Metro stations